Leandro Barrios Rita dos Martires known as Leandro Barrios or Leandrinho (born June 6, 1986) is a Brazilian footballer who plays as a forward for Ponte Preta.

Club career
Also known as Leandrinho, Barrios rejoined Herediano from Guatemalan side Municipal in summer 2013, after having played for the club in 2006 and 2008. He also played for Alajuelense in Costa Rica after signing for them in 2010. He moved to Mexican second division outfit San Luis in June 2014.

Club Career Statistics
Last Update  24 August 2011 

 Assist Goals

References

External links

1986 births
Living people
Brazilian footballers
Brazilian expatriate footballers
Associação Atlética Portuguesa (Santos) players
Londrina Esporte Clube players
C.S. Herediano footballers
Barrios, Leandro
F.C. Paços de Ferreira players
L.D. Alajuelense footballers
Sanat Mes Kerman F.C. players
Al-Raed FC players
C.S.D. Municipal players
Denizlispor footballers
Sivasspor footballers
Atlético San Luis footballers
Ümraniyespor footballers
Kardemir Karabükspor footballers
Altay S.K. footballers
Belgian Pro League players
Liga FPD players
Primeira Liga players
Persian Gulf Pro League players
Saudi Professional League players
Liga Nacional de Fútbol de Guatemala players
Ascenso MX players
Süper Lig players
TFF First League players
Brazilian expatriate sportspeople in Belgium
Brazilian expatriate sportspeople in Costa Rica
Brazilian expatriate sportspeople in Portugal
Brazilian expatriate sportspeople in Iran
Brazilian expatriate sportspeople in Saudi Arabia
Brazilian expatriate sportspeople in Guatemala
Brazilian expatriate sportspeople in Turkey
Expatriate footballers in Belgium
Expatriate footballers in Costa Rica
Expatriate footballers in Portugal
Expatriate footballers in Iran
Expatriate footballers in Saudi Arabia
Expatriate footballers in Guatemala
Expatriate footballers in Turkey

Association football forwards